Echioceratidae is an extinct family of ammonites that lived during Sinemurian stage of Early Jurassic.

Description
Ammonites belonging to this family are characterised by serpenticone shells with a keel, which can be surrounded by grooves if a species is densely ribbed and compressed. The whorl section is either circular or has flat sides. Ribs are simple and strong with the exception of Leptechioceras which instead possessed a strongly compressed, smooth outer whorl. The initial ontogenical stage of these ammonites is typically smooth but very short. Tubercules are represented in a few genera within this group.

Genera and subgenera
Following genera are members of this family:

 Palaeoechioceras Spath, 1929
 Gagaticeras Buckman, 1913
 Plesechioceras Trueman and Williams, 1925
 Orthechioceras Trueman and Williams, 1925
 Echioceras Bayle, 1878
 Paltechioceras Buckman, 1924
 Leptechioceras Buckman, 1923
L. (Leptechioceras)
L. (Neomicroceras) Donovan, 1966

Distribution
Fossils of species within this family have been found in the Jurassic rocks of north Africa, South and North America, Europe and Asia.

References

Psiloceratoidea
Ammonitida families
Early Jurassic ammonites of Europe
Ammonites of Europe
Ammonites of Africa
Ammonites of Asia
Ammonites of North America
Ammonites of South America
Sinemurian first appearances
Sinemurian extinctions